Alyssa is a female given name.

Alyssa may also refer to:

 Alyssa (album), a 1989 album by Alyssa Milano
 Dido, Queen of Carthage in Greco-Roman stories, also referred to as Elissa or Alyssa 
 Alyssa, cantata by Raoul Laparra for which in 1903 he was awarded the Premier Grand Prix de Rome

See also
Alisa (disambiguation)
Alissa (given name)